A dead drop or dead letter box is a method of espionage tradecraft used to pass items or information between two individuals (e.g., a case officer and an agent, or two agents) using a secret location. By avoiding direct meetings, individuals can maintain operational security.  This method stands in contrast to the live drop, so-called because two persons meet to exchange items or information.

Spies and their handlers have been known to perform dead drops using various techniques to hide items (such as money, secrets or instructions) and to signal that the drop has been made. Although the signal and location by necessity must be agreed upon in advance, the signal may or may not be located close to the dead drop itself. The operatives may not necessarily know one another or ever meet.

Considerations
The location and nature of the dead drop must enable retrieval of the hidden item without the operatives being spotted by a member of the public, the police, or other security forces—therefore, common everyday items and behavior are used to avoid arousing suspicion. Any hidden location could serve, although often a cut-out device is used, such as a loose brick in a wall, a (cut-out) library book, or a hole in a tree. 

A dead drop spike is a concealment device similar to a microcache. It has been used since the late 1960s to hide money, maps, documents, microfilm, and other items. The spike is water- and mildew-proof and can be pushed into the ground or placed in a shallow stream to be retrieved at a later time.

Signaling devices can include a chalk mark on a wall, a piece of chewing gum on a lamppost, or a newspaper left on a park bench. Alternatively, the signal can be made from inside the agent's own home, by, for example, hanging a distinctively-colored towel from a balcony, or placing a potted plant on a window sill where it is visible to anyone on the street.

Drawbacks
While the dead drop method is useful in preventing the instantaneous capture of either an operative/handler pair or an entire espionage network, it is not without disadvantages. If one of the operatives is compromised, they may reveal the location and signal for that specific dead drop. Counterintelligence can then use the dead drop as a double agent for a variety of purposes, such as to feed misinformation to the enemy or to identify other operatives using it or ultimately to booby trap it. There is also the risk that a third party may find the material deposited.

Modern techniques

On January 23, 2006, the Russian FSB accused Britain of using wireless dead drops concealed inside hollowed-out rocks ("spy rock") to collect espionage information from agents in Russia. According to the Russian authorities, the agent delivering information would approach the rock and transmit data wirelessly into it from a hand-held device, and later, his British handlers would pick up the stored data by similar means.

SecureDrop, initially called DeadDrop, is a software suite for teams that allows them to create a digital dead drop location to receive tips from whistleblowers through the Internet. The team members and whistleblowers never communicate directly and never know each other's identity, therefore allowing whistleblowers to dead-drop information despite the mass surveillance and privacy violations which had become commonplace in the beginning of the twenty-first century.

See also
 Espionage
 Foldering
 PirateBox
 USB dead drop

References

Bibliography
 "Russians accuse 4 Britons of spying".International Herald Tribune. January 24, 2006. News report on Russian discovery of British "wireless dead drop".
 "Old spying lives on in new ways". BBC. 23 January 2006.
 Madrid suspects tied to e-mail ruse. International Herald Tribune. April 28, 2006.
 Military secrets missing on Ministry of Defence computer files
 Robert Burnson, "Accused Chinese spy pleads guilty in U.S. 'dead-drop' sting", Bloomberg, 25 novembre 2019.

Further reading 

 Robert Wallace and H. Keith Melton, with Henry R. Schlesinger, Spycraft: The Secret History of the CIA's Spytechs, from Communism to al-Qaeda, New York, Dutton, 2008. .

Espionage devices
Espionage techniques